Most Mexican states do not have an official flag.  For these states, a de facto flag is used for civil and state purposes. State flags of Mexico have a 4:7 ratio and typically consist of a white background charged with the state's coat of arms.

At least seven states have official flags: Baja California Sur, Durango, Guerrero, Jalisco, Querétaro, Quintana Roo and Tlaxcala. Except for Jalisco and Tlaxcala, each official flag is simply a white background charged with the state's coat of arms. Coahuila, Colima, Oaxaca, Tabasco and Tamaulipas adopted its coat of arms into a flag.

Two states have provisions in their constitutions explicitly declaring that there shall be no official state flag.  These states are Baja California and Campeche.

De jure flags

De jure coat of arms in a flag

De facto flags

De facto flags with special designs

Historical

Gallery

De jure

De facto

See also
List of Mexican flags
Flag of Jalisco
Flag of Tlaxcala

References

 
 
Mexico
Mexico